Pierre-Paul Riquet, Baron de Bonrepos (29 June 1609 (some sources say 1604) – 4 October 1680) was the engineer and canal-builder responsible for the construction of the Canal du Midi.

Background
Paul Riquet was born in Béziers, Hérault, France, the eldest son of solicitor, state prosecutor and businessman Guillaume Riquet.  As a youth, Riquet was only interested in mathematics and science.  He married Catherine de Milhau at age 19.

As a fermier général ("farmer-general") of Languedoc-Roussillon, he was a tax farmer responsible for the collection and administration of the gabelle (salt tax) in Languedoc. He was appointed collector in 1630, and was also a munitions provider to the Catalan Army. Riquet became wealthy and was given permission by the King to levy his own taxes. This gave him greater wealth, which allowed him to execute grand projects with technical expertise.

The Canal du Midi

Riquet is the man responsible for building the 240-kilometre-long artificial waterway that links the southern coast of France to Toulouse to link to the canal/river system that ran across to the Bay of Biscay, one of the great engineering feats of the 17th century. The logistics were immense and complex, so much so that other engineers including the ancient Romans had discussed the idea but not proceeded with it. Even so, Louis XIV was keen for the project to proceed, largely because of the increasing cost and danger of transporting cargo and trade around southern Spain where pirates were common.

Planning, financing, and construction of the Canal du Midi completely absorbed Riquet from 1665 forward. Numerous problems occurred, including navigating around many hills and providing a system that would feed the canal with water through the dry summer months. Advances in lock engineering and the creation of a 6 million cubic metre artificial lake, the Bassin de St. Ferréol which harvested water from streams on the Black Mountain near the Naurouze watershed, provided solutions.

The high cost of construction depleted Riquet's personal fortune and the seemingly insurmountable problems caused his sponsors, including Louis XIV, to lose interest. Riquet's major engineering achievements included the Fonseranes Lock Staircase and the Malpas Tunnel, the world's first navigable canal tunnel. The canal was completed in 1681, eight months after Riquet's death.
He is buried in the Cathedral Saint-Etienne in Toulouse.

References

External links
 Béziers – birthplace of Riquet

People from Béziers
1609 births
1680 deaths
French canal engineers
Canal du Midi
Fermiers généraux